Rabih Kayrouz (born 1973)  is a Lebanese fashion designer, creator and founder of the fashion house Maison Rabih Kayrouz, established in Paris in 2008.

Early life
Rabih Kayrouz was born in Lebanon in 1973. Kayrouz migrated to Paris at the age of 16 to study at the Chambre Syndicale de la Couture Parisienne.

Career
In 1995, after training for several months in the workshops of design houses Dior and Chanel,  Kayrouz returned to Beirut where he developed a reputation for designing evening gowns and wedding dresses.

In 2008, Kayrouz returned to Paris to open his own design house at 38, Boulevard Raspail. The location was  previously “Le Petit Theatre de Babylone” where Beckett's play Waiting for Godot was performed for the first time.  Since 2009, Kayrouz has been a guest designer for the Chambre Syndicale de la Haute Couture, with his seasonal collections included in the bi-annual Paris haute-couture fashion shows. In 2011, Kayrouz was selected by the prominent French ELLE Magazine as one of the “Emerging New Talents”.
In 2012 he abandoned the appellation “couture” to focus on ready-to-wear.
In the same year, he created a capsule collection for La Redoute (French mail order brand).

Design signature
Kayrouz's design signature has been described as pragmatic, but daring in its use of haute-couture style codes.  He has been praised for his use of style “know-how” in creating ready-to-wear collections which complement the urban lifestyle.

Contribution
Kayrouz co-founded in 2008 a non-profit organisation called the Starch Foundation, which helps young Lebanese designers launch and promote their debut collections.

References

External links
 
  Making of Maison Rabih Kayrouz for La Redoute
  Kayrouz,Le luxe pour initiés
  News Report Maison Rabih Kayrouz
  Heureux comme Rabih à Paris
  Lebanese Designer Interview: Rabih Kayrouz
  Maison Rabih Kayrouz 
  Apparel design – Rabih Kayrouz

Living people
Haute couture
Lebanese fashion designers
High fashion brands
1973 births
Lebanese emigrants to France